Whistle Stop is a 1946 American film noir crime film directed by Léonide Moguy and starring George Raft, Ava Gardner, Victor McLaglen, and Tom Conway. The screenplay was written by Philip Yordan, based on a novel by Maritta M. Wolff.

Plot
Away for two years, a woman named Mary (Ava Gardner) returns to her home in a small town (a 'whistle stop'). She attempts to reconcile with Kenny Veech (George Raft), her former romantic interest, but he is jealous and bitter, particularly after she takes up with Veech's mortal enemy, nightclub owner Lew Lentz (Tom Conway).

Gitlo (Victor McLaglen), a friend of Kenny's who works for Lentz, talks Kenny into a scheme to rob and kill Lentz at a train station as he leaves for Detroit, then hide his corpse to make Mary believe he chose not to return. Mary manages to foil Veech's plans, but she remains torn between the two men.

Seeking vengeance, Lentz tries to pin a murder on Veech and Gitlo, who barely make a getaway. Gitlo and Lentz end up killing one another, and Mary finds Veech recovering from a gunshot wound to the arm he had suffered while making his and Gitlo's escape. The movie ends with them arm-in-arm, walking away to live happily ever after.

Cast
 George Raft as Kenny Veech 
 Ava Gardner as Mary 
 Victor McLaglen as Gitlo 
 Tom Conway as Lew Lentz 
 Jorja Curtright as Fran 
 Jane Nigh as Josie Veech
 Florence Bates as Molly Veech
 Charles Drake as Ernie

Production
The film was based on the debut novel by 23 year old Maritta Wolff who wrote it in her senior year at the University of Michigan.

Philip Yordan bought the film rights in November 1944 and wrote a screenplay. Yordan later said "I used a small portion of the actual book and developed the story from there" because he said the book was too explicit sexually.

In February 1945 Yordan sold the project to producer Seymour Nebenzal. Yordan remained associate producer in exchange for 50% of the profits. The film was financed by a bank in Palm Springs. Ava Gardner was borrowed from MGM and Tom Conway from RKO.

Yordan said "my script was very good" but felt the producer made a mistake casting Raft. "He had been a big name around the world and he was on the skids and we could afford him, but he looked like hell and who wanted to see this old man with Ava Gardner? It should have been a young guy like Burt Lancaster."

Filming started June 29, 1945.

Reception

Box office
The film was a box office hit. It was one of a series of popular movies Raft made as a freelancer following leaving Warner Bros.

Critical response
When the film was released, film critic Bosley Crowther, dismissed it, writing, "A slice of sordid life in a small mid-Western town was somewhat faithfully reflected in Maritta Wolff's novel, Whistle Stop, but the same can't be said for the picture, based upon it, which came to the Globe on Saturday. This plainly remote and artificial concoction lacks flavor, consistency, reason and even dramatic suspense. And it is also abominably acted—which covers about everything ... The film was directed by Leonide Moguy, late of France. Don't ask us why."

Variety, however, was more positive in their review.  The staff wrote, "Heavy melodrama, adapted from the Maritta M. Wolff novel of same title, is somber melodrama, vignetting a seamy side of life in a small town. Production and playing are excellent and the direction strong, although latter is given to occasional arty tone ... Gardner displays her best work to date as the girl who must have her man. McLaglen hits top form as the not too bright bartender, and Conway is smooth as the heavy. Score is an aid in projecting the somber mood."

Recently, film critic Dennis Schwartz was harsh in his review, writing, "A low-level B film on the seamy side-of-life, that revolves around a bitter love triangle. It's directed without too much skill by Leonide Moguy (Paris After Dark/Two Women/Diary of a Bad Girl) ... The wannabe film noir is dumber than dumb. The convoluted storyline has about as much going for it as the risible loser performance does by a miscast George Raft, who never looked quite as stiff as he does in this stinker. All the main characters are unsympathetic, and the plot is brainless. It's one of those somber films about the human condition that has nothing important to say about the human condition, but is unintentionally funny when it tries to be the most serious."

In popular culture

In 2000, Bay-Tek Incorporated released an arcade skill-game under the name "Whistle Stop". In a 2015 interview with Noah Simmons, the artist who worked on the designs for the game, it was revealed that a main inspiration for the theme of the game was the "...elements of noir genre found in the 1946 film 'Whistle Stop' ... but most influential to the development was the train-station scene." The game borrows multiple sound effects from the film.

References

Notes

Bibliography
 Franz Marksteiner: You Don't Know Mary. Whistle Stop, von Leonide Moguy (1946). In: Christian Cargnelli, Michael Omasta (eds.): Schatten. Exil. Europäische Emigranten im Film noir. PVS, Vienna 1997, .

External links
 
 
Review of film at Variety

Streaming audio
 Whistle Stop on Lux Radio Theater: April 15, 1946

1946 films
1946 crime films
American crime films
American black-and-white films
1940s English-language films
Film noir
Films scored by Dimitri Tiomkin
Films based on American novels
United Artists films
Films directed by Léonide Moguy
Films produced by Seymour Nebenzal
1940s American films